"Sweet Little '66" is a song written and recorded by American singer-songwriter Steve Earle.  It was released in October 1987 as the third single from the album Exit 0.  The song reached number 37 on the Billboard Hot Country Singles & Tracks chart.

Chart performance

References

1987 singles
Songs written by Steve Earle
Song recordings produced by Tony Brown (record producer)
Song recordings produced by Emory Gordy Jr.
MCA Records singles
1987 songs